Yelsk is a town in Gomel Region, Belarus.

Yel'sk was greatly affected by radioactive fallout from the Chernobyl disaster in 1986.

History 
The city was occupied by German troops during summer 1941. The local Jews of Yel'sk were gathered and deported towards Kalinkovichi and Mozyr.  Approximately two weeks after the departure of the Jews of Yel'sk, the Jews of the nearby Jewish village of Skorodnoye were brought in and locked inside a building. Then, the Germans set fire to the building all the Jews were burned alive.

References 

Towns in Belarus
Populated places in Gomel Region
Minsk Voivodeship
Holocaust locations in Belarus